The Roman Catholic Diocese of Port Pirie is a suffragan Latin Rite diocese of the Archdiocese of Adelaide, erected in 1887 covering the Yorke and Eyre Peninsulas, Flinders Ranges, Nullarbor Plain, and Mid and Far North regions of South Australia, Australia.

History
The Diocese of Port Augusta was canonically erected by Pope Leo XIII on 10 May 1887, the same day the pope elevated the See of Adelaide to a metropolitan archdiocese and placed the new diocese in its province. On 5 August 1951 the seat of the diocese was moved from Port Augusta to Port Pirie, with the name of the diocese being also changed.

Boundaries
In terms of geographic size the Diocese of Port Pirie is Australia's second largest diocese (after Darwin) and one of the largest in the Southern Hemisphere. The diocese measures 978,823 km2, which is made up of the largest portion of South Australia and the southern parts of the Northern Territory.

Cathedral
St Mark's Cathedral, Port Pirie, is the seat of the diocese. Prior to the relocation of the administrative centre to Port Pirie, the cathedral was All Saints' Cathedral, Port Augusta.

Bishops

Ordinaries
The following individuals have been elected as Roman Catholic Bishops of Port Pirie or any of its precursor titles:
{| class="wikitable"
!Order
!Name
!Title
!Date enthroned
!Reign ended
!Term of office
!Reason for term end
|-
|align="center"| ||John O'Reily † ||Bishop of Port Augusta ||align="center"|13 May 1887 ||align="center"|5 January 1895 ||align="right"| ||Elevated as Archbishop of Adelaide
|-
|align="center"| ||James Maher † ||Bishop of Port Augusta||align="center"|10 January 1896 ||align="center"|20 December 1905 ||align="right"| ||Died in office
|-
|align="center"| ||John Henry Norton † ||Bishop of Port Augusta||align="center"|18 August 1906 ||align="center"|22 March 1923 ||align="right"| ||Died in office
|-
|align="center"| ||Andrew Killian †||Bishop of Port Augusta ||align="center"|26 February 1924 ||align="center"|11 July 1933 ||align="right"| || Elevated as Coadjutor Archbishop of Adelaide
|-
|align="center"| ||Norman Thomas Gilroy †||Bishop of Port Augusta ||align="center"|10 December 1934 ||align="center"|1 July 1937 ||align="right"| || Elevated as Coadjutor Archbishop of Sydney
|-
|align="center"| ||John Joseph Lonergan †||Bishop-Elect of Port Augusta ||align="center"|8 January 1938 ||align="center"|14 July 1938 ||align="right"| days ||Died prior to being ordained as Bishop
|-
|align="center"| ||Thomas Absolem McCabe †||Bishop of Port Augusta ||align="center"|13 December 1938 ||align="center"|15 November 1951 ||align="right"| || Appointed as Bishop of Wollongong
|-
|align="center"| ||Bryan Gallagher †||Bishop of Port Pirie ||align="center"|13 March 1952 ||align="center"|11 August 1980 ||align="right"| || Resigned and appointed Bishop Emeritus of Port Pirie
|-
|align="center"| ||Francis Peter de Campo †||Bishop of Port Pirie ||align="center"|11 August 1980 ||align="center"|23 April 1998 ||align="right"| || Died in office
|-
|align="center"| ||Daniel Eugene Hurley ||Bishop of Port Pirie ||align="center"|27 November 1998 ||align="center"|3 July 2007 ||align="right"| || Appointed as Bishop of Darwin
|-
|align="center"| ||Gregory O'Kelly SJ ||Bishop of Port Pirie ||align="center"|15 April 2009 ||align="center"|1 August 2020 || align="right" | || Retired
|-
|12
|Karol Kulczycki SDS
|Bishop of Port Pirie
|
|
|
|
|-
|}

Coadjutor bishop
Francis Peter de Campo † (1979–1980)

Other priest of this diocese who became bishop
Francis Augustin Henschke †, appointed Auxiliary Bishop of Adelaide in 1937

See also

 Roman Catholicism in Australia

References

External Links
Diocese of Port Pirie

Port Pirie
Port Pirie, Roman Catholic Diocese of
Port Pirie
Port Pirie
Port Pirie
Port Pirie